Regina Moroz (born ) is a Russian female volleyball player. She is a member of the Russia women's national volleyball team and played for Dinamo Kazan in 2014.

She was part of the Russian national team at the 2014 FIVB Volleyball Women's World Championship in Italy.

Clubs
  Dinamo Kazan (2014)

References

1987 births
Living people
Russian women's volleyball players
Place of birth missing (living people)
Universiade medalists in volleyball
Universiade bronze medalists for Russia
Medalists at the 2011 Summer Universiade
20th-century Russian women
21st-century Russian women